Old Furnace is located in Union County, Pennsylvania, about  south of the city of Williamsport and about  north of Harrisburg.

Union County, Pennsylvania